Accursio Bentivegna (born 21 June 1996) is an Italian professional footballer who plays as a forward for  club Juve Stabia.

Club career
Born in Sciacca, Province of Agrigento, Sicily, Bentivegna started his career at Palermo, playing for their Primavera side. He made his Serie A debut for Palermo against Sampdoria as a substitute replacing Franco Vázquez. On 31 August 2014, he moved to Como on loan. He scored his first goal for Como on 27 October 2015, in a 3−1 defeat against Cesena. After scarcely playing for Palermo's first team, he was loaned out to Serie B club Ascoli in January 2017.

On 18 September 2020, he joined Juve Stabia. On 7 January 2021, he was loaned to Imolese.

Career statistics

Club

References

External links
 Profile at Palermo F.C.
 
 
 
 

1996 births
Living people
People from Sciacca
Sportspeople from the Province of Agrigento
Footballers from Sicily
Italian footballers
Association football forwards
Palermo F.C. players
Como 1907 players
Ascoli Calcio 1898 F.C. players
Carrarese Calcio players
S.S. Juve Stabia players
Imolese Calcio 1919 players
Serie A players
Serie B players
Serie C players
Italy youth international footballers